Pied hornbill may refer to:
 The Malabar pied hornbill
 The Oriental pied hornbill 
 The African pied hornbill
 The great hornbill, also known as the great pied hornbill